2point4 Children is a BBC Television sitcom that was created and written by Andrew Marshall. It follows the lives of the Porters, a seemingly average, working-class London family whose world is frequently turned upside-down by bad luck and bizarre occurrences.

The show was originally broadcast on BBC One from 1991 to 1999, and ran for eight series, concluding on 30 December 1999 with the special episode "The Millennium Experience". The show is regularly repeated in the UK. In Australia showings are on UKTV. The name of the show comes from the stereotypical average size of a typical nuclear family in the UK at the time of the writing of the first series.

The show regularly picked up audiences of up to 14 million throughout the 1990s, with an average of between 6 and 9 million. The final episode was viewed by 9.03 million people.

Lead actor Gary Olsen died in 2000, effectively ruling out a return of the show for any further series.

Cast

Main characters
Bill Porter (Belinda Lang)
Ben Porter (Gary Olsen)
Jenny Porter (Clare Woodgate, series 1 and 2; Clare Buckfield, series 3–8)
David Porter (John Pickard)
Rona Harris (Julia Hills)
Christine Atkins (Kim Benson, guest appearance series 1, regular series 2–8)
Aunt Belle, Bette – (Liz Smith played both characters)

Supporting characters
Tina (Patricia Brake, series 1; Sandra Dickinson, series 2–8)
Auntie Pearl (Barbara Lott)
Gerry (Leonard O'Malley)
Tony (Tom Roberts)
Dora Grimes (Annette Kerr)
Adam (Paul Raffield)
Jake 'The Klingon' Klinger (Roger Lloyd-Pack, series 3–6)
Joss (Mik Scarlet, series 2 episode 2 (Hormones)

Plot summary
The Porters are a working-class family who live in Chiswick, London who at first seem normal enough. Bill is the sensible, level-headed mother who does the cooking and housework whilst working for a bakery with her highly sexed best friend Rona. Ben is the father, who is often just as immature as the children. He runs a heating repair business with his moody and sarcastic assistant Christine.

Jenny is the typical teenage daughter, keen on boys, music and vegetarianism, and David is the mischievous younger brother, who enjoys horror films, aliens and annoying his older sister.

However, the Porters' world is frequently upended by bizarre occurrences and bad luck. Whether it is dealing with flatulent dogs, a frozen body in a freezer in the front room, or even stumbling across a warehouse filled with Shirley Bassey's cast-off ballgowns, anything seems possible in the Porters' world. Traditionally Christmas episodes would feature characters collectively performing a musical number.

Episodes

The show originally ran from 1991 to 1999. 56 episodes were made over eight series, including six Christmas specials in which the cast performed carols or original theme songs. Although the series was made over the course of eight years, the show's in-universe timeline appears to be much shorter, with Jenny Porter stated to be 14 in series one, yet only just starting university at age 18 in the final series.

Andrew Marshall wrote all of the episodes, except for three in series seven which were written by Paul Alexander, Simon Braithwaite and Paul Smith.

Home media
BBC Enterprises released a video in 1993, comprising the first three episodes of the series, which are known as: Leader of the Pack, Saturday Night and Sunday Morning, and When the Going Gets Tough, the Tough Go Shopping.

The first three series were released on Region 2 DVD by Eureka Video in 2005. A box set of the first three series was also made available in 2008, again through Eureka Video, with music changes within the episodes. Eureka Video stated that "sales were not good" and they released no further series. 2Entertain, part of BBC Worldwide, say they have tried many times to license the series for distribution by a third party but the high clearance costs for music and imagery used has been the main deterrent.

A Facebook campaign for a release of the whole series was started in 2009.

The series was added to Britbox on 16th December, 2021
In March 2022, all 56 episodes were made available on the BBC iPlayer for one year.

Remake
In 1997 a remake of the show debuted in the Netherlands: Kees & Co starring Simone Kleinsma. The remake ran for eight series between 1997 and 2006. The first five series were adapted from the original English scripts, whilst the last three series featured original storylines and characters. In 2018 it was announced that the remake would return for a ninth series with Kleinsma reprising her role.

References

External links

 Comedy Guide

2point4 Children at Phill.co.uk Comedy Guide

2point4 Children at BFI Screenonline

1991 British television series debuts
1999 British television series endings
1990s British sitcoms
BBC television sitcoms
Chiswick
English-language television shows
Television series about dysfunctional families
Television series about marriage
Television series about siblings
Television shows set in London